Trikona is a 2022 Indian Kannada film written and directed by Chandrakantha. The film is produced by BR Rajashekar Under Police Praki Production. The movie features veteran actors Suresh Heblikar, Lakshmi along with Achyuth Kumar, Sudha Rani, Sadhu Kokila, Marutesh and Rajveer in prominent roles. Surendranath B R has composed the music, Jeevan Prakash is the editor and cinematography is handled by Srinivas Vinnakota.

Trikona is a thriller, the story deals with a bunch of people and experiences with anger, patience, ego and death. The movie is set for grand release in 200 theatres in April 2022. Due to multiple Kannada movie releases on Ugadi eve and non availability of theatres, Trikona release date postponed to April 8.

Plot 
The story of Trikona revolves around Nataraj (Suresh Heblikar), Kodandarama (Achyutha Kumar) and Trivikrama (Rajveer) heading towards Mangalore for different reasons. In between their journey at a remote area of the forest, all 3 cars stuck up with one problem simultaneously. From here the testing time Kaala (Marutesh) begins his play, as a valuator of patience. Nataraj (Suresh Heblikar) who is aged 65 is gifted with immense patience and even at this old age he needs to defeat one more problem, the only weapon he has is patience.

Cast 
 Suresh Heblikar 
 Lakshmi
 Achyuth Kumar
 Sudha Rani
 Sadhu Kokila
 Marutesh
 Rajveer

Production 
Veteran actors Lakshmi and Suresh Heblikar unite back in Trikona after 38 years, they had last acted together in Mani Rathnam’s directorial debut Pallavi Anu Pallavi. The movie was shot over 60 days in scenic regions of Karnataka, key locations were Bengaluru, Hassan, Sakleshpur, Puttur, Hebri and Agumbe. Director Chandrakantha was excited that Trikona is the first film to be shot at Kudlu Theertha Falls located near Udupi. 
Trikona movie got U/A certificate for the thriller subject.

Soundtrack 

Surendranath B R has composed music and also handled the background score. Popular Kannada music label A2 Music has acquired the audio rights.

References

External links 
 
 

2022 films
2020s Kannada-language films